is a junction passenger railway station located in the city of Fuchū, Tokyo, Japan, operated by the private railway operator Keio Corporation.

Lines 
Higashi-fuchū Station is served by the Keiō Line  and the Keiō Keibajō Line.

Station layout 
This station consists of one island platform and one side platform serving four tracks,  with an elevated station building located above.

Platforms

History
It was renamed to its present name on 26 October 1940.

Passenger statistics
In fiscal 2019, the station was used by an average of 21,274 passengers daily. 

The passenger figures (boarding passengers only) for previous years are as shown below.

Surrounding area
 Tokyo Racecourse

See also
 List of railway stations in Japan

References

External links

  Keio station information 

Keio Line
Keio Keibajo Line
Stations of Keio Corporation
Railway stations in Tokyo
Railway stations in Japan opened in 1935
Fuchū, Tokyo